Teu Ó hAilpín is an Irish sportsperson (Gaelic footballer) playing for Na Piarsaigh GAA and Australian Rules football club Leeside Lions.

Born in Cork, he was a Gaelic Athletic Association player who played for the Éire Óg club in Ennis and Na Piarsaigh in Cork. He is the brother of Cork senior hurling players Seán Óg Ó hAilpín and Aisake and older brother of Carlton Australian footballer Setanta. He left Cork City team Na Piarsaigh in 2001 and signed for Clare side Éire Óg. Teu declared for Clare in 2001, despite having played for minor and Under-21 level for Cork, he later moved to London after a short term in intercounty senior football. Ó hAilpín won the London Senior Hurling Championship with London GAA side Robert Emmett's in 2004.

Leeside Lions career
Ó hAilpín decided to quit Gaelic football and joined Australian rules football club Leeside Lions in the Australian Rules Football League of Ireland (ARFLI). He immediately became a star and helped them to win the 2007 Premiership with Tadhg Kennelly's cousin, Denis Kennelly.

References

Year of birth missing (living people)
Living people
Australian Gaelic footballers
Australian hurlers
Clare inter-county hurlers
Cork inter-county Gaelic footballers
Dual players
DCU Gaelic footballers
DCU hurlers
Éire Óg Ennis Gaelic footballers
Éire Óg Ennis hurlers
Irish expatriate sportspeople in England
Irish players of Australian rules football
Irish people of Rotuman descent
Na Piarsaigh Gaelic footballers
Na Piarsaigh hurlers
Teu
Robert Emmett's (London) hurlers
Sportspeople from Cork (city)
20th-century Irish people
21st-century Irish people